Government Medical College Kannur, Pariyaram, or Pariyaram Medical College, was established in March 1993 at Pariyaram in Kannur district, Kerala state, South India. It was the first medical college to be established under the cooperative sector in India and was then called Academy of Medical Sciences (ACME).

See also
Government Medical College, Kozhikode
Government Medical College, Kollam
Government Medical College, Thiruvananthapuram

References

External links 

 Official website

Medical colleges in Kerala
Hospitals in Kerala
Kannur
Universities and colleges in Kannur district
Educational institutions established in 1993
1993 establishments in Kerala